Astylosternus laurenti is a species of frog in the family Arthroleptidae.
It is endemic to Cameroon.
Its natural habitats are subtropical or tropical moist lowland forests and rivers.
It is threatened by habitat loss.

References

Astylosternus
Endemic fauna of Cameroon
Taxonomy articles created by Polbot
Amphibians described in 1978